Żerniki Wrocławskie is a village in the administrative district of Gmina Siechnice, within Wrocław County, Lower Silesian Voivodeship, in south-western Poland. Prior to 1945 it was in Germany. The village is 10 km from Wrocław and is the part of eastern part of Wrocaław's bypass.

The village has a population of 1,348.

References

Villages in Wrocław County